Jay Bird Springs is an unincorporated community in Dodge County, in the U.S. state of Georgia.

History
The first permanent settlement at Jay Bird Springs was made about 1900.

References

Unincorporated communities in Dodge County, Georgia